Suboro TV  is a television channel owned by the Syriac Orthodox Church. It broadcasts in Classical Syriac, Turoyo and Arabic.

Name 
The name of the channel suboro means "annunciation" in the Syriac language.

References

Aramaic-language television channels
Television channels and stations established in 2018
2018 establishments in Syria
Syriac Orthodox Church